Pleistodontes imperialis is a species of fig wasp which is native to Australia.  It has an obligate mutualism with Ficus rubiginosa, the fig species it pollinates. It is the type species of the genus Pleistodontes

References

Agaonidae
Hymenoptera of Australia
Insects described in 1882
Taxa named by Edward Saunders (entomologist)